TOPEX/Poseidon was a joint satellite altimeter mission between NASA, the U.S. space agency; and CNES, the French space agency, to map ocean surface topography. Launched on August 10, 1992, it was the first major oceanographic research satellite. TOPEX/Poseidon helped revolutionize oceanography by providing data previously impossible to obtain. Oceanographer Walter Munk described TOPEX/Poseidon as "the most successful ocean experiment of all time." A malfunction ended normal satellite operations in January 2006.

Description

Before TOPEX/Poseidon, scientists had only a brief glimpse of Earth's ocean as a whole from the pioneering but short-lived Seasat satellite. TOPEX/Poseidon's radar altimeter provided the first continuous global coverage of the surface topography of the oceans. From orbit 1,330 kilometers above Earth, TOPEX/Poseidon provided measurements of the surface height of 95 percent of the ice-free ocean to an accuracy of 3.3 centimeters. The satellite's measurements of the hills and valleys of the sea surface led to a fundamentally new understanding of ocean circulation and its effect on climate.

Goal 
The mission's most important achievement was to determine the patterns of ocean circulation - how heat stored in the ocean moves from one place to another. Since the ocean holds most of the Earth's heat from the Sun, ocean circulation is a driving force of climate. TOPEX/Poseidon made it possible for the first time to compare computer models of ocean circulation with actual global observations and use the data to improve climate predictions.

Results 
While a three-year prime mission was planned, TOPEX/Poseidon delivered more than 10 years of data from orbit. In those years, the mission:

 Measured sea level with an unprecedented accuracy
 Mapped global tides for the first time
 Monitored effects of currents on global climate change and produced the first global views of seasonal changes of currents
 Monitored large-scale ocean features like Rossby and Kelvin waves and studied such phenomena as El Niño, La Niña, and the Pacific Decadal Oscillation
 Mapped basin-wide current variations and provided global data to validate models of ocean circulation
 Mapped year-to-year changes in heat stored in the upper ocean
 Improved our knowledge of Earth's gravity field
 Observed the temperature of the ocean and main seas for over a period of 10 years

TOPEX/Poseidon was launched using an Ariane 42P expendable launch vehicle, along with Korea Institute of Technology's Kitsat-1 satellite and France's S80/T satellite . Lift-off from Kourou in French Guiana took place on 1992-08-10. The mission was named after the ocean TOPography EXperiment and the Greek god of the ocean Poseidon.

In October 2005 after more than 62,000 orbits, TOPEX/Poseidon stopped providing science data after a momentum wheel malfunctioned, and the satellite was turned off on January 18, 2006.

Use of results 
TOPEX/Poseidon's data have been the subject of more than 2,100 research publications.
Some of the areas in which the data are used include:

 Climate Research
 Coral Reef Research
 El Niño & La Niña Forecasting
 Fisheries Management
 Hurricane Forecasting
 Marine Mammal Research
 Offshore Industries
 Ship Routing

Measurements continue 

TOPEX/Poseidon's follow-on mission, Jason-1, was launched in 2001 to continue the ongoing measurements of sea surface topography. The two satellites, TOPEX/Poseidon and Jason-1, flew in a tandem mission for three years providing twice the coverage of the sea surface and allowing scientists to study smaller features than could be seen by one satellite.

The record of global sea surface height begun by TOPEX/Poseidon and  Jason-1 continues into the future with the Ocean Surface Topography Mission on the Jason-2 satellite, which launched in June 2008. The Jason-3 mission launched January 17, 2016.

Instruments 
TOPEX/Poseidon flew two onboard altimeters sharing the same antenna, but only one altimeter was operated at any time, with TOPEX given preference (on average 9 in 10 cycles during the first 10 years of the mission).

 TOPEX: The NASA-built Nadir pointing Radar Altimeter using C band (5.3 GHz) and Ku band (13.6 GHz) for measuring height above sea surface.
 Poseidon: The CNES-built solid state Nadir pointing Radar Altimeter using Ku band (13.65 GHz).

In addition to the altimeters, the TOPEX Microwave Radiometer (TMR) operating at 18, 21, and 37 GHz was used to correct for atmospheric wet path delay.

The satellite was also equipped with instruments to accurately pinpoint its location. Precise orbit determination is crucial because errors in locating the spacecraft would distort the sea level measurement calculated from the altimeter readings.

Three independent tracking systems determined the position of the spacecraft. The first, the NASA laser retroreflector array (LRA) reflected laser beams from a network of 10 to 15 ground-based laser ranging stations under clear skies. The second, for all-weather, global tracking, was provided by the CNES Doppler Orbitography and Radiopositioning Integrated by Satellite tracking system receiver (DORIS). This device uses microwave doppler techniques (changes in radio frequency corresponding to relative velocity) to track the spacecraft. DORIS consists of an on-board receiver and a global network of 40 to 50 ground-based transmitting stations.

The third system used an on-board experimental Global Positioning System (GPS) demonstration receiver to precisely determine the satellite's position continuously by analyzing the signals received from the U.S. Air Force's GPS constellation of Earth-orbiting satellites. TOPEX/Poseidon was the first mission to demonstrate that the Global Positioning System could be used to determine a spacecraft's exact location and track it in orbit. Knowing the satellite's precise position to within 2 centimeters (less than 1 inch) in altitude was a key component in making accurate ocean height measurements possible.

A number of satellites (See links) use exotic dual-band radar altimeters to measure height from a spacecraft. That measurement, coupled with orbital elements (possibly from GPS), enables determination of the topography.  The two lengths of radio waves permit the altimeter to automatically correct for varying delays in the ionosphere.

Gallery

See also

 French space program
 1992 in spaceflight
 2004 Indian Ocean earthquake
 Jason 1
 Ocean Surface Topography Mission/Jason-2
 Seasat
 Sea level rise

References

External links

 Official site at CNES
 Official site at NASA
 TOPEX/Poseidon technical page at NASA (archived)
 Current technical page at NASA
 University of Colorado Sea Level Change site
 NASA TOPEX/Poseidon fact sheet
 TOPEX/Poseidon and Jason-1  data are available at http://sealevel.colorado.edu/ and http://podaac.jpl.nasa.gov/.

Earth observation satellites of the United States
Satellites of France
NASA satellites
1992 in France
Earth satellite radar altimeters
Spacecraft launched in 1992
Spacecraft launched by Ariane rockets